Lambda Piscium, Latinized from λ Piscium, is a solitary, white-hued star in the zodiac constellation of Pisces. With an apparent visual magnitude of 4.49, it is visible to the naked eye, forming the southeast corner of the "Circlet" asterism in Pisces. Based upon a measured annual parallax shift of 30.59 mas as seen from Earth, it is located 107 light years distant from the Sun. Lambda Piscium is a member of the Ursa Major Stream, lying among the outer parts, or corona, of this moving group of stars that roughly follow a common heading through space.

This well-studied star has a stellar classification A7 V, indicating it is an A-type main-sequence star that is generating energy through hydrogen fusion at its core. It has 1.8 times the mass of the Sun and double the Sun's radius. The star is radiating 13.3 times the Sun's luminosity from its photosphere at an effective temperature of 7,734 K. Lambda Piscium is around 583 million years old and is spinning with a projected rotational velocity of 70 km/s.

Naming

References

A-type main-sequence stars
Ursa Major Moving Group

Pisces (constellation)
Piscium, Lambda
BD+00 5037
Piscium, 018
222603
116928
8984